Bathybates vittatus is a species of fish in the family Cichlidae. It is endemic to Lake Tanganyika where it forms schools and feeds mainly on clupeids.

References

vittatus
Taxa named by George Albert Boulenger
Fish described in 1914
Taxonomy articles created by Polbot